Fabric is one of the oldest historic districts of Timișoara, Romania. Its name comes from the factories that were built here since its appearance in the 18th century.

History 

Until after 1716, the present-day Fabric, located east of the Cetate district, was not inhabited. In 1716 there were only two water mills in this area. The northern one may have served as a powder keg in the 1660s.

A so-called "esplanade" surrounded the fortress of Timișoara until 1892. It was a 948-meter-wide strip of land on which building was forbidden, so that a possible enemy could not hide behind the buildings that would have been built here. Therefore, Fabric was built outside the esplanade. The first manufactories were built east of the fortress, in the present-day Fabric, starting with 1732 (according to other sources 1727). The construction of the district was approved in 1744. Its outline was determined by the sinuous shapes of the surrounding swamps and water arms. Fabric was at that time an incipient industrial suburb, with many manufactories, workshops and guilds located here. The most important guilds in Fabric in the 18th and 19th centuries were those of the shoemakers, saddlers, furriers, coopers, boilermakers and fishermen. The bakers, butchers, locksmiths, watchmakers, millers, wig makers and tailors were also well represented. The individual trades united to form societies with their own festive days, patron saints and flags. In the 18th century there were eight mills, a cloth factory (1725), a silk factory, a tobacco factory, a brewery (1718) and a waterworks. The waterworks was depicted on the city's coat of arms in 1781 and was built in 1726 by engineer Karl Schindler on the orders of Count Claude Florimond de Mercy. In 1850 there was an oil factory that produced rapeseed and sunflower oil. Agricultural and handicraft tools as well as bells, organs, vinegar, alcohol, soap, towels, silk, gunpowder, bricks, pencils and pasta were manufactured in Fabric in the 18th century.

Initially, Fabric consisted of two distinct districts: the "Rascian Fabric", inhabited by Orthodox and the smaller "German Fabric", inhabited mainly by Germans. After Timișoara was proclaimed a royal free city (1781), these districts were united into one. Fabric experienced a remarkable development in the first half of the 19th century. In the middle of that century, 53.04% of the entire civilian population of Timișoara lived in Fabric.

The entire district was restructured between 1901 and 1903, following university professor László Szesztay's plans, thus proposing the connections between Fabric and Cetate districts. The old bridges made of wood or iron from the 19th century were replaced by reinforced concrete bridges at the beginning of the 20th century. This is how the Decebal, Dacilor and Mihai Viteazul bridges were built. The Bega Canal received a new course by 1910 as well.

Multiculturalism 
During the Habsburg rule, Fabric was divided by ethnicity: Romanians lived in Vlașca Mare, Serbs in Old Fabric and Germans in German Fabric. Gypsies, called Neuen Banater ( "new Banat people"), settled in the so-called "New World" in 1753. Italians, French and Spaniards, who traded in rice, silk and wine, also worked in Fabric. Greeks, Armenians, Jews and Czechs settled here in the Belle Époque.

Historical monuments 
The built-up areas that border the main squares of the district – Trajan Square and Romans' Square – are protected urban sites of national importance. Some of the buildings in these sites include:
 Moorish Synagogue (1889)
 Mercury Palace (1909)
 Millennium Church, (1901), the largest Roman Catholic church in Timișoara
 Neptune Palace (1914), former public baths
 Serbian Community House (1895)
 St. Elijah Church (1913)
 St. George Serbian Church (1755), one of the oldest churches in Timișoara
 Ștefania Palace (1909)
 Timișoreana Brewery (1718), the first brewery in Romania
 the Waterworks (1910), one of the oldest hydropower plants in Romania

References 

Districts of Timișoara